Antonio Del Monaco, better known as Tony Del Monaco (27 December 1935 – 27 May 1993), was an Italian pop singer, and actor.

Biography
Del Monaco was born in the city of Sulmona in Abruzzo, Italy. He started in show business as an actor, appearing in the 1961 musical comedy L'adorabile Giulio (The adorable Julio), starring Carlo Dapporto and Delia Scala. In 1965, he performed on the TV show Campioni a Campione (Champions at Campione) the song "Vita Mia" ("My life"), which he'd composed and which entered the Italian pop charts.

In 1959, he debuted at the Vibo Valentia song festival, ranking 3rd with the song "Al ciel manca un angelo" ("The heaven is missing an angel"). In 1967, he participated in the Sanremo Festival with "È più forte di me" ("It's stronger than me"), paired with Betty Curtis, and released "Una spina e una rosa" ("A thorn and a rose") the same year.<ref name=rep>"Morto Il Cantante Tony Del Monaco" ("Singer Tony Del Monaco Dead"), La Repubblica, 29 May 1993 (in Italian)</ref> Del Monaco competed in Sanremo again in 1968, paired with Dionne Warwick, with the song "La voce del silenzio " ("The voice of silence"); in 1969, with "Un'ora fa" ("An hour ago") paired with Fausto Leali; and in 1970, with the Claudio Villa song "Serenata".

In the 1960s and 1970s, Del Monaco composed many songs that were covered by star singers of that era, such as "L'ultima occasione" (as "Once There Was A Time") by Mina and Tom Jones.

He died on 27 May 1993, from an "incurable disease", in a clinic in Ancona.

Selected discography
45s
1961 – "Silver blue" / "Silver blue" (instrumental) (RCA Italiana PM 0136)
1965 – "Vita mia" / "Quando si alza la luna" (CGD N-9601)
1966 – "Se la vita è così" / "Con l'aiuto del tuo amore" (CGD N-9619)
1967 – "È più forte di me" / "Con un po' di volontà" (CGD N-9650)
1967 – "Tu che sei l'amore" / "Per vivere" (CGD N-9659)
1967 – "Parla tu cuore mio" / "L'uomo che vuoi tu" (CGD N-9665)
1968 – "La voce del silenzio" / "Una piccola candela" (CGD N-9675)
1968 – "Magia" / "È diventato amore" (CGD N-9687)
1968 – "Vola vola" / "Se c'è un peccato" (Ricordi N-10508)
1969 – "Un'ora fa" / "Se c'è un peccato" (Ricordi SRL-10532)
1969 – "Una spina e una rosa" / "Peccato" (Ricordi SRL-10542)
1970 – "Serenata" / "Per te, per te, per te" (Ricordi SRL-10581)
1970 – "Cuore di bambola" / "Io non-ci penso più" (Ricordi SRL-10603)
1974 – "Vivere insieme" / "Il viaggio" (Fonit Cetra SP 1558)
1975 – "Siamo stati innamorati" / "Negli occhi nel cuore nell'anima" (Fonit Cetra SP 1585)
1978 – "Te ne vai" / "Come un poeta d'osteria" (Idea ID NP 701)

LPs
1966 – Tony Del Monaco'' (CGD FG 5030)

References

20th-century Italian male singers
Italian male singer-songwriters
1935 births
1993 deaths
People from Sulmona
Sanremo Music Festival
People of Abruzzese descent